The 2013 UEC European Track Championships was the fourth edition of the elite UEC European Track Championships in track cycling and took place at the Omnisport Arena in Apeldoorn, Netherlands, between 18 and 20 October. The Event was organised by the European Cycling Union.

All ten Olympic events, (sprint, team sprint, keirin, team pursuit and omnium, for both men and women) and the non-Olympic men's madison championship and points races for both genders were held as part of the championships.

A highly competitive championships, gold medals were share among five teams, and medals among ten teams, with Germany leading the medal table with three gold and three silver medals. Great Britain won the most medals with eight, three of them also gold, the same number as Russia. The host Netherlands also enjoyed a highly successful event, with two gold medals and six in all, by far their strongest showing at this level. Ireland also won its first ever medal at this level, a bronze in the men's omnium for world scratch race champion Martyn Irvine.

Individually Laura Trott of Great Britain, Maximilian Levy of Germany and Elia Viviani each won two gold medals, while Kristina Vogel won three medals, including gold in the women's sprint. Trott was also part of the Great Britain women's team pursuit quartet who twice lowered the world record in their event.

Events

 q = rode in qualification round only.
 w = won on countback
 shaded events are non-Olympic

Medal table

Participating nations
24 nations participated.

 (3)
 (13)
 (12)
 (4)
 (13)
 (6)
 (1)
 (4)
 (17)
 (1)
 (18)
 (18)
 (4)
 (2)
 (3)
 (13)
 (9)
 (19) (See: Netherlands at the 2013 European Track Championships)
 (18)
 (23)
 (1)
 (13)
 (7)
 (20)

References

External links

European Cycling Union

European Track Championships
European Track Championships
 
European Track Championships
International cycle races hosted by the Netherlands
UEC European Track Championships
Cycling in Apeldoorn